Trupanea paradaphne is a species of tephritid or fruit flies in the genus Trupanea of the family Tephritidae.

Distribution
Brazil.

References

Tephritinae
Insects described in 1953
Diptera of South America